The following lists events that happened during 2010 in Kuwait.

Incumbents
Emir: Sabah Al-Ahmad Al-Jaber Al-Sabah 
Prime Minister: Nasser Al-Sabah

Events

July
 July 30 - A United States Army private is transferred from Kuwait to a US Marines brig in Quantico, Virginia.

August
 August 3 - Seven people go on trial in Kuwait accused of spying for Iran against Kuwait and the United States; they deny all charges and say they were tortured into confessing.
 August 11 - The United States threatens to sell an anti-ballistic missile to Kuwait to counter alleged "current and future threats".

References

 
Kuwait
Kuwait
Years of the 21st century in Kuwait
2010s in Kuwait